Râu de Mori is a commune in Hunedoara County, Transylvania, Romania. It is composed of eleven villages: Brazi (Gureny), Clopotiva (Klopotiva), Ohaba-Sibișel (Ohábasibisel), Ostrov (Nagyosztró), Ostrovel (Osztrovel), Ostrovu Mic (Kisosztró), Râu de Mori, Sibișel (Sebeshely), Suseni (Malomvízszuszény), Unciuc (Uncsukfalva) and Valea Dâljii (Vályadilsi).

References

Communes in Hunedoara County
Localities in Transylvania
Țara Hațegului